Cecil Charles Worster-Drought (2 August 1888–27 October 1971) was an English physician and neurologist.  He discovered and named Worster-Drought syndrome.
He was one of the founders of Moor House School, Oxted, Surrey, a school that specialises in speech and language disorders.

References

1888 births
1971 deaths
20th-century English medical doctors